Nicholas Goodrick-Clarke (15 January 195329 August 2012) was a British historian and professor of Western esotericism at the University of Exeter, best known for his authorship of several scholarly books on the history of Germany between the World Wars and Western esotericism.

Early life and education
Goodrick-Clarke was born in Lincoln, UK, on 15 January 1953, and was an Open Exhibitioner at Lancing College. He studied German, politics, and philosophy at the University of Bristol, and gained a B.A. with distinction. Moving to St. Edmund Hall, Oxford, Goodrick-Clarke took a Ph.D. with a dissertation on the modern Occult Revival and Theosophy at the end of the twentieth century.

Career
Goodrick-Clarke's Ph.D. dissertation was the basis for his most celebrated work, The Occult Roots of Nazism. This book has been continually in print since its first publication in 1985, and has been translated into twelve languages. Later notable works include his well-regarded Paracelsus: Essential Readings, published in 1990, and Black Sun: Aryan Cults, Esoteric Nazism, and the Politics of Identity, published in 2001.

In his varied career, Goodrick-Clarke worked as a schoolmaster, banker, and a successful fundraiser for The Campaign for Oxford. In 2002, he was appointed a Research Fellow in Western Esotericism at the University of Lampeter, and then in 2005 he was appointed to a personal chair in the Department of History at Exeter University. As Professor of Western Esotericism and Director of the Exeter Centre for the Study of Esotericism (EXESESO), he developed a successful distance-learning M.A. in Western Esotericism and successfully supervised a number of doctoral students. While at Exeter he wrote The Western Esoteric Traditions: A Historical Introduction, published in 2008.

In 1983, Goodrick-Clarke was one of the founder members of "The Society", an informal London-based association of professional and amateur scholars of esotericism, including Ellic Howe, the publisher Michael Cox, John Hamill, and the scholar of Rosicrucianism, Christopher McIntosh. He was a founding member of both the European Society for the Study of Western Esotericism and the Association for the Study of Esotericism (ASE), in America. He was a faculty member of the New York Open Center from 1995.

Later life and death
Goodrick-Clarke was the Director of the Centre for the Study of Esotericism (EXESESO) within the College of Humanities at Exeter until his death on 29 August 2012. John Morgan of the white supremacist blog Counter-Currents published an obituary. 

He was survived by his wife Clare, whom he married in 1985.

Bibliography
 The Occult Roots of Nazism: The Ariosophists of Austria and Germany, 1890–1935, 1985 – 
 Enchanted City – Arthur Machen and Locality: Scenes from His Early London Years, 1880–85, 1987 – 
 The Western Esoteric Traditions: A Historical Introduction, 1988 – 
 Hitler's Priestess: Savitri Devi, the Hindu-Aryan Myth and Neo-Nazism, 1998–2000 – 
 Unknown Sources: National Socialism and the Occult, co-authored with Hans Thomas Hakl – 
 Black Sun: Aryan Cults, Esoteric Nazism, and the Politics of Identity, 2002 – 
 Helena Blavatsky, edited and introduced by Goodrick-Clarke, 2004 – 
 G.R.S. Mead and the Gnostic Quest, by G. R. S. Mead, edited and introduced by Clare Goodrick-Clarke and Nicholas Goodrick-Clarke, 2005 –

Contributed
  Handbook of the Theosophical Current, 2013 
 Constructing Tradition: Means and Myths of Transmission in Western Esotericism, 2010 
 Emanuel Swedenborg: Visionary Savant in the Age of Reason by Ernst Benz, translated and introduced by Goodrick-Clarke –  .
 Paracelsus: Essential Readings, edited by Goodrick-Clarke –  .
 Swedenborg and New Paradigm Science by Ursula Groll, translated by Goodrick-Clarke –  .
 The Rosicrucian Enlightenment Revisited, 1999 – 
 Decadence and Innovation: Austro-Hungarian Life and Art at the Turn of the Century, 1989 
 Dreamer of the Day: Francis Parker Yockey and the Postwar Fascist International by Kevin Coogan, foreword by Goodrick-Clarke, Autonomedia, Brooklyn, NY 1998 –  .
 Rudolf Steiner by Rudolf Steiner  (Author), Richard Seddon (Editor), Nicholas Goodrick-Clarke (Preface) Publisher: North Atlantic Books

See also 
 Academic study of Western esotericism

References

External links
 EXESESO (Exeter Centre for the Study of Esotericism)
 

1953 births
2012 deaths
Academics of the University of Exeter
Alumni of St Edmund Hall, Oxford
Alumni of the University of Bristol
British historians
Helena Blavatsky biographers
Historians of fascism
Historians of Nazism
People educated at Lancing College
Western esotericism scholars
People from Lincoln, England